Phil GiaQuinta is a Democratic member of the Indiana House of Representatives, representing the House District 80 since November 8, 2006. He currently serves as House Minority Leader.

References

External links
Indiana State Legislature - Representative Phil GiaQuinta Official government website
Project Vote Smart - Representative Phil GiaQuinta (IN) profile
Follow the Money - Phil GiaQuinta
2008 2006 campaign contributions

1955 births
21st-century American politicians
Indiana University Bloomington alumni
Living people
Democratic Party members of the Indiana House of Representatives
Politicians from Fort Wayne, Indiana